The 1944–45 season in Swedish football, starting August 1944 and ending July 1945:

Honours

Official titles

Competitions

Promotions, relegations and qualifications

Promotions

League transfers

Relegations

Domestic results

Allsvenskan 1944–45

Allsvenskan promotion play-off 1944–45

Division 2 Norra 1944–45

Division 2 Östra 1944–45

Division 2 Västra 1944–45

Division 2 Södra 1944–45

Division 2 promotion play-off 1944–45 
1st round

2nd round

Svenska Cupen 1944 
Final

National team results 

 Sweden: 

 Sweden:

National team players in season 1944/45

Notes

References 
Print

Online

 
Seasons in Swedish football